Eduin Estiwer Quero Albarracín (born 22 April 1997) is a Venezuelan footballer who plays as a defender for Rio Grande Valley FC on loan from Deportivo La Guaira.

International career
Quero was called up to the Venezuela under-20 side for the 2017 FIFA U-20 World Cup.

Career statistics

Club

Honours

International
Venezuela U-20
FIFA U-20 World Cup: Runner-up 2017
South American Youth Football Championship: Third Place 2017

References

External links

1997 births
Living people
Venezuelan footballers
Venezuelan expatriate footballers
Association football defenders
Deportivo Táchira F.C. players
Zulia F.C. players
Casa Pia A.C. players
Rio Grande Valley FC Toros players
Venezuelan Primera División players
Venezuelan expatriate sportspeople in Portugal
Expatriate footballers in Portugal
Venezuelan expatriate sportspeople in the United States
Expatriate soccer players in the United States
USL Championship players
People from San Cristóbal, Táchira